Hwangdi  is a village and ward in Gulmi District in the Lumbini Province of western Nepal. At the time of the 1991 Nepal census it had a population of 1688 persons living in 331 individual households.

References

External links
UN map of the municipalities of Gulmi District

Populated places in Gulmi District